Native American women in the arts include the following notable individuals. This list article is of women visual artists who are Native Americans/First Nations of the U.S and Canada. The Indian Arts and Crafts Act of 1990 defines "Native American" as those being enrolled in either federally recognized tribes or state-recognized tribes or "an individual certified as an Indian artisan by an Indian Tribe." This list does not include non-Native American women artists who use Native American themes or motifs in their work. Additions to the list need to reference a recognized, documented source and specifically name the tribal affiliation according to federal and state lists.

Basketry 

Primrose Adams (born 1926), noted for her spruce root basketry. 
Elsie Allen (22 September 1899 – 31 December 1990), Pomo basket weaver.
Annie Antone (born 1955), is a Native American Tohono O'odham basket weaver from Gila Bend, Arizona.
Carrie Bethel (1898–1974) Kucadikadi (Northern Paiute) basketmaker
Yvonne Walker Keshick (born 1946), Anishinaabe quill artist and basket maker and 2014 National Endowment for the Arts National Heritage Fellow
Mabel McKay, Pomo/Wintu/Patwin, born 1907 Nice, Lake County, CA. Basket weaver.

Beadwork 
Nellie Two Bear Gates (1854–1935), Iháŋktȟuŋwaŋna Dakota artist whose beadwork depicted the history and culture of her people.
Emily Waheneka, (born Kis-Sun-Y) Warm Springs, Wasco and Paiute. b. 1919 Simnasho, Oregon. Beadworking and sewn work, represented in the permanent collection of the Museum of Northwest Art, and others.

Ceramics 

Mrs. Ramos Aguilar, potter from Santo Domingo Pueblo (currently known as Kewa Pueblo), New Mexico, United States.}
Daisy Hooee, Hopi-Tewa potter who helped preserve traditional methods of pottery making.
Tammy Garcia, Santa Clara Pueblo sculptor and ceramic artist
Lucy M. Lewis (1890s–1992), Pueblo potter
Maria Martinez, San Ildefonso Pueblo, born 1886 San Ildefonso. Potter.
Nora Naranjo-Morse, Santa Clara Pueblo, born 1953 Espanola, New Mexico. Potter.
Ida Sahmie (born 1960), Navajo ceramic artist known for combining Hopi traditional pottery with Navajo iconography.
Margaret Tafoya (August 13, 1904 – February 25, 2001), Tewa artist known for traditional pottery. Recipient of a 1984 National Heritage Fellowship.
Sara Fina Tafoya, Kha'po Owingeh (Santa Clara Pueblo) (1863–1949)

Drawing 

Ruth Annaqtuusi Tulurialik (born 1934), Canadian Inuit artist born Qamani'tuaq (Baker Lake), Nunavut.
Annie Pootoogook (1969–2016), Inuk, Cape Dorset (Kinngait), Nunavut, Canada. Drawing and printmaking.
Irene Avaalaaqiaq Tiktaalaaq (born 1941), noted for her drawings, prints, and wall hangings.

Installation arts

Jaune Quick-to-See Smith, Salish/Cree/Shoshone, born 1940 St. Ignatius, Montana. BA art education, Framingham State College, 1976. MA art, UNM, 1980. Work includes 1996 Alki Beach Trail (Seattle) memorial markers and art installations and 1992 North Wind Fish Weir Project (Green River Trail, Seattle).
Tanis Maria S'eiltin (born 1951), Tlingit installation artist, painter, printmaker, and sculptor
Charlene Teters (Slum Tah), Spokane, born 1952 Spokane Reservation, Washington. Installation artist, painter, activist and educator.

Jewelry 
Denise Wallace (born 1957, Seattle), Sugpiaq (Eskimo). AA fine arts Institute of American Indian Arts (IAIA), Santa Fe 1981. Jeweler; studied lapidary work and silversmithing in Seattle prior to IAIA. Movable jewelry includes doors, latches, removable parts; created from gold, silver, ivory fossil, semiprecious stones.

Mixed media 

Hulleah Tsinhnahjinnie, Seminole/Creek/Navajo. born 1954 Phoenix. attended IAIA. BFA California College of Arts and Crafts (Oakland). Instructor at IAIA, SF Art Inst, UC Davis, California College of Arts and Crafts. Mixed media.
Gail Tremblay, Onondaga/Micmac. born 1945 Buffalo New York. BA drama UNH 1967; MFA creative writing U Oregon 1969. As of publishing, member of faculty at The Evergreen State College. Multi-media.
Sara Bates, Cherokee, born 1944 Muskogee, Oklahoma BA Fine Art and Women's Studies, Cal State Bakersfield 1987; MFA Sculpture and Painting UCSB 1989, mixed media

Painting 

 Pop Chalee ("Blue Flower") born Merina Lujan 1906 Castle Gate UT. Painter,  muralist, performer.
Sharron Ahtone Harjo (born 1945), Kiowa painter from Oklahoma.
Helen Hardin, Tsa-Sah-Wee-Eh ("Little Standing Spruce"), Santa Clara Pueblo, b. 1943 Abq NM. Painter/printmaker in the collections of the Heard Museum, Wheelwright Museum of the American Indian, Museum of New Mexico and others.
Georgia Mills Jessup (March 19, 1926 – December 24, 2016), painter, sculptor, ceramicist, muralist, and collage artist of African-American and Pamunkey descent. 
Mary Longman (Aski-Piyesiwiskwew), Salteaux, Gordon First Nation. born 1964 Fort Qu'Appelle, Saskatchewan. Painting, drawing, sculpture. Associate Professor at University of Saskatchewan specializing in aboriginal art history.
Tonita Peña, Quah Ah, San Ildefonso Pueblo, born 1893 San Ildefonso, attended St. Catherine's Indian School. Painter and muralist.
Pablita Velarde - Tse Tsan ("Golden Dawn"), Santa Clara Pueblo, born 1918 at Santa Clara Pueblo, New Mexico. Attended St. Catherine's Indian School. Painter, book illustrator, muralist.
 Jaune Quick-to-See Smith, Salish/Cree/Shoshone, born 1940 St. Ignatius, Montana. BA art education, Framingham State College, 1976. MA art, UNM, 1980. Work includes paintings and other art.
Kay WalkingStick, Cherokee. born 1935 Syracuse New York. BFA Beaver College (Pennsylvania) 1959; MFA Pratt Institute 1975. Painter.
Emmi Whitehorse, Navajo. born 1956–1957, Crownpoint, New Mexico. BA painting UNM 1980. MA printmaking UM 1982. Painter.

Performing arts 

Rebecca Belmore (born March 22, 1960) Ojibwe performance artist. Residing in Canada, her performance and installation work has been exhibited internationally. 
Lisa Mayo, Gloria Miguel and Muriel Miguel, Kuna/Rappahanonock-Powhatan. Theater/comedy "Spiderwoman Theater Company".
Malinda M. Maynor, Lumbee, born Robeson County North Carolina (probably on reservation). A.B. History and Literature Harvard 1995; MA documentary film and video, Stanford 1997. Won film awards Best Indian-Produced Short Documentary 1997 Red Earth Film Festival and Best Short Documentary at South by Southwest Film Festival, 1997

Photography 

Carmelita Little Turtle (Carm Little Turtle), Apache, Tarahumara, born 1952 Santa Maria, California, attended Navajo Community College, UNM, College of the Redwoods; photography Shenandoah Films in Arcata
Linda Lomahaftewa, Hope-Choctaw, born 1947 Phoenix; Assoc. Institute of American Indian Arts in Santa Fe, BFA and MFA San Francisco Art Institute 1970 and 1971. Photographer.
Jolene Rickard, Tuscarora, born 1956 Niagara Falls New York. BFA Rochester Institute of Technology 1978. MA, PhD SUNY Buffalo 1996. Photographer.
Phoebe Farris, Powhatan-Renape, born 1952 Washington DC, BA Fine Arts, CUNY 1975; MPS Art Therapy Pratt Inst. 1977; PhD. Art Ed. UMD College park, 1988. Photography.
Shelley Niro, Mohawk, born 1954 Niagara Falls, New York, attended Durham College in Ontario, Ontario College of Art and Design HFA 1990. Photography.

Printmaking

Pitseolak Ashoona (born ᐱᑦᓯᐅᓛᖅ ᐊᓲᓇ) Inuk, (c. 1904–1983) born Nunivut (Nottingham Island) died 1983 Cape Dorset. Printmaker and sewing/embroidery artist.
Jane Ash Poitras, Cree, born 1951 Fort Chipewyan, Alberta. MS microbiology, University of Alberta. BFA Columbia 1983. MFA Columbia 1985. Printmaker, mixed-media collage, writing.
Jean LaMarr, Pit River/Paiute, born 1945 Susanville, California, attended San Jose City College, UCB, U Oregon; art instructor at SF Art Institute and U Oregon. Printmaker.

Sculpture

 Kenojuak Ashevak (October 3, 1927 – January 8, 2013), Inuit artist from Kinngait who specialized in soapstone carving, drawing, etching, stone-cut, and print-making
 Lillian Pitt, Wa'-K-a-mu, Warm Springs Yakima Wasco, born 1943 Warm Springs, Oregon. AA, mental health and human services, Mt Hood Community College 1981. Maskmaker, bronze casting, raku ware
 Roxanne Swentzell, Santa Clara Pueblo, born 1992 Taos, New Mexico. Attended Institute of American Indian Arts and Portland Museum Art School. Ceramic sculpture.

Textiles

Mary Kawennatakie Adams (1917–1999), Mohawk First Nations textile artist and basket maker.
Elizabeth Angrnaqquaq (1916–2003), innovative Canadian Inuk textile artist active from the 1970s to early 2000s. 
Jennie Thlunaut (1892–1986), Tlingit Chilkat weaver
Gwen Westerman (Sisseton-Wahpeton Dakota Oyate). Fluent in the Dakota language; Professor of English and Director of the Humanities Program at Minnesota State University, Mankato. Writer, poet, fiber artist.

Woodworkers

Kathleen Carlo-Kendall, Koyukon woodcarver
Freda Diesing (1925–2002), Haida woodcarver
Rose Powhatan, Pamunkey, born 1948 Washington DC. BFA painting/art history Howard University. MA art education/art history, howard. Attended Catholic University DC, University of DC, and University of London. Wood totems, silkscreen prints.

See also

 Native American art
 List of Native American artists
 Timeline of Native American art history
 List of indigenous artists of the Americas
 List of Native American artists from Oklahoma
 Native Americans in the United States
 Native American women in the arts
 List of writers from peoples indigenous to the Americas
 Native American basketry
 Native American pottery

References

Sources

Lists of American artists

Lists of Native American people
Lists of women artists
Native American women artists